Harriet Muncaster (born 1988) is the writer and illustrator  of the Isadora Moon series of books, which has been translated in more than 30 languages and is being turned into a 52-episode animated series for Sky Kids.

Muncaster was born in Saudi Arabia in 1988, and spent her youth in Herefordshire. She graduated in Fine Arts (Illustration) before she published her first book in 2014. I am a Witch's Cat won the 2016 Blue Hen Book Award of the Delaware Library Association in the Younger Readers category. Her main series, featuring the vampire fairy Isadora Moon, was accepted by Oxford University Press who initially offered her a four-book deal.

Bibliography
2014-2015: I am a Witch's Cat and Happy Halloween, Witch's Cat!
2014: Glitterbelle: The Sparkliest Princess Ever! and Glitterbelle: Me and You (illustrations only)
2015: The Night Before Christmas (illustrations only)
2016: The Biggest Smallest Christmas Present
2016-...: Isadora Moon series, 15 books as of January 2023
Mirabelle, spinoff series from Isadora Moon, 7 books as of January 2023
Emerald, spinoff series from Isadora Moon
Victoria Stitch, 3 books

Notes

1988 births
Living people
English children's writers
English children's book illustrators